is a park in western Shinjuku, Tokyo, Japan. The park is bordered by Honnnan Dori and Kita Dori to the north, Junisha Dori to the west, Suido Dori or Minami Dori to the south, and Koen Dori to the east. The park is located directly in front of the Tokyo Metropolitan Government Building, and is surrounded by some of Tokyo's tallest buildings including the Hyatt Regency Tokyo, the Park Hyatt, and other hotels and office buildings.

The park is accessible for the many office workers in the area and an ideal place for them to spend their lunch time. You can also see the belongings of homeless people carefully wrapped up in blue plastic ready to be unpacked at night time.

Shinjuku Central Park is different from Shinjuku Gyo-en, located on the south-eastern side of Shinjuku Station. Right next to the park is Tochomae Station, which is served by the Toei Ōedo Line.

Features
The park features Shinjuku Niagara Falls.

References

External links
 

Parks and gardens in Tokyo
Shinjuku